Derius Swinton II (April 26, 1985) is an American football  who is the assistant special teams coach for the Las Vegas Raiders. He previously served as an assistant coach for the Arizona Cardinals, Detroit Lions, Chicago Bears, San Francisco 49ers, Denver Broncos Los Angeles Chargers and Kansas City Chiefs.

Early years
Swinton played college football at Hampton University from 2003 to 2006. He finished his college career with 103 tackles, 19 passes defensed and eight interceptions.

Coaching career

Tennessee
In 2007, Swinton became a defensive graduate assistant at Tennessee and would stay in that role all the way through the 2008 season.

St. Louis Rams
In 2009, Swinton was hired by the St. Louis Rams as the special teams quality control coach, he maintained that role for three seasons, before being let go after the 2011 season.

Kansas City Chiefs
In 2012, Swinton had been offered another job in the same role by the Kansas City Chiefs. He worked with Kansas City's newly hired offensive quality control coach, Jim Bob Cooter, who he was familiar with from his days at Tennessee.

Denver Broncos
In 2013, Swinton was hired by the Denver Broncos as a special teams assistant. He stayed with Broncos for two seasons from 2013 to 2014.

Chicago Bears
In 2015, Swinton followed John Fox, who was fired by the Broncos, to the Chicago Bears to serve as a special teams assistant.

San Francisco 49ers
On January 22, 2016, Swinton was hired by the San Francisco 49ers as their special teams coordinator under by head coach Chip Kelly.

Chicago Bears (second stint)
Following the firing of Kelly in San Francisco, Swinton returned to the Chicago Bears as their assistant special teams coach in 2017.

Detroit Lions
In 2018, Swinton was hired by the Detroit Lions as an offensive assistant under head coach Matt Patricia.

Arizona Cardinals
In 2019, Swinton joined the Arizona Cardinals under the Bill Walsh NFL diversity coaching fellowship. In 2020, Swinton was hired full-time by the Cardinals to serve as their assistant special teams coach.

Los Angeles Chargers
On January 25, 2021, Swinton was hired by the Los Angeles Chargers as their special teams coordinator under head coach Brandon Staley. Following the 2021 season, on January 19, 2022, Swinton was fired by the Chargers.

Raiders
In 2023 he was hired by the Raiders as a special teams assistant.

References

External links
 Los Angeles Chargers profile

1985 births
Living people
American football safeties
Chicago Bears coaches
Denver Broncos coaches
Hampton Pirates football players
Hampton Pirates men's basketball players
Kansas City Chiefs coaches
San Francisco 49ers coaches
St. Louis Rams coaches
Tennessee Volunteers football coaches
Sportspeople from Newport News, Virginia
African-American coaches of American football
African-American players of American football
American men's basketball players
Arizona Cardinals coaches
Los Angeles Chargers coaches
Detroit Lions coaches
21st-century African-American sportspeople
20th-century African-American people